Diop Kamau (born Don Jackson, March 16, 1958) is an American civil rights activist who investigates and works to resolve instances of police misconduct, neglect, or abuse. In 1994 he founded policeabuse.com, and is also its CEO.

Life and career

Don Jackson is an African American civil rights activist and investigative journalist who has pioneered groundbreaking investigations into two of the nation's most pernicious dimensions of policing: bias-based profiling and the widespread refusal by the police to properly document serious allegations of abuse and egregious misconduct.

Jackson was born on March 16, 1958, at BonAir hospital in South Central Los Angeles. He is the fourth child of Margie Faye Woods, a nurse, and Woodrow Jackson, one of the first African Americans to join the Los Angeles County Sheriff's Office. Woodrow and Margie raised Don along with his five siblings in a neighborhood of manicured lawns and middle-class homes in Compton, California. Don remembers his father rushing out of their home in the midst of the Watts rebellion in 1965 to join other police officers attempting to control the violence.

Jackson grew up in an environment where hard work was rewarded, and education was encouraged. He attended Birmingham high school where he excelled in sports, serving as captain of both his high school football and wrestling team. He went on to California Lutheran College on an athletic scholarship, where he earned a bachelor's degree in criminal justice.

After college Jackson joined the Ventura County Sheriff's Office. His time there was punctuated by tests of his character and physical stamina. Despite the Ventura County police academy's  record of washing out black recruits, Jackson graduated from the academy and later transferred to the Hawthorne Police Department where he would hone his skills as an elite undercover investigator. Jackson rose through the ranks quickly at Hawthorne as he sponsored several daring undercover operations.

Jackson was taught by his parents that when you are African American you must often be twice as good as your competitors. With that in mind, he earned the top score on three consecutive promotional exams to become the youngest sergeant on the force. But as his career flourished, Jackson became frustrated with the routine brutality and frequent racism displayed amongst his peers.

Jackson rebelled against his brothers in blue, first by filing complaints about misconduct directed against minority citizens, and later by going public with a complaint of racism at the Hawthorne Police Department. As Jackson's battle with the Hawthorne PD spilled into the media, his father Woodrow Jackson, who was near retirement, was stopped by a group of Pomona California police officers. The officers identified the elder Jackson as a potential robbery suspect. He was taken from his car and brutally attacked. A midnight phone call between Jackson and his dad would change the course of Jackson's life: After learning of the brutality his father suffered, Don decided to take on the police in a one-man war against abusive cops.

Jackson was a pioneer in the early development of hidden camera testing and the recording of public officials. He used cutting edge computer technology to document police misconduct in 5000 investigations in over 100 cities, often accompanied by a rotating list of volunteers and undercover investigators willing to put their lives on the line to test the police. News organizations became aware of Jackson's efforts and often went in-tow.

Jackson's most well-known such investigation was the 1989 test of the Long Beach, California Police Department. While testing profiling among officers for a news broadcast, Jackson was beaten, thrown into a plate glass window, and arrested. As is often the case in hundreds of similar incidents, the officers falsified their arrest report. However, unlike the many hundreds of police-citizen interactions which are not filmed, this one was captured on video.

The video recording of Jackson's arrest exploded on national television and resonated in a way that other stories about police misconduct failed to. The videotaped arrest and the obviously false police report of the incident gave police critics a formidable weapon. Congresswoman Maxine Waters, along with others, rallied to Jackson's support and called for hearings and investigations.

In 1992, the California State Assembly held hearings and Jackson was called to testify. The hearings resulted in a new law, which increased penalties for false reports to a felony and added requirements for all officers in the state of California to receive racial sensitivity training.(Ca. Penal code 118.1).

Though a new law had been passed, Jackson was not satisfied.

Jackson's one-man war on the cops would change in 1991 when he met the love of his life, actress Tyra Ferrell, at a Hollywood party. Ferrell was hanging out with friends at a house party when she and Jackson shared a glance. It was love at first sight and the two would become inseparable a year later when they married.

The marriage ceremony was consecrated on the deathbed of Jackson's mother Margie who was in the final stages of breast cancer. Her final joy was watching her son take his vows of marriage with a woman she adored.

If anyone thought the marriage would slow down Jackson's work, it had just the opposite effect. Ferrell, an A-list African American actress who had just completed the trailblazing film Boyz in the Hood, joined Jackson to support his cause. They left Southern California together in 1992, driving and camping out on a Goldwing motorcycle for their honeymoon.

With Ferrell's support, Jackson purchased the most sophisticated recording equipment available and went on a tear across the country producing eight Emmy and Edward R Morrow award-winning investigations into police misconduct and racial profiling. The investigations forced policy changes, police firings, and thousands of hours of retraining for officers stemming from the high-profile exposes Jackson produced with local and national media.

Jackson traveled the country with his wife, daughter, and a 40-foot RV hauled by a Ford F350 pick-up truck loaded with hi-tech investigative equipment. As Jackson hit the streets, Tyra Ferrell stood by his side guiding his investigations. Many times, Ferrell was up all-night waiting by the phone to make sure Jackson got home safe.

In 1994, Jackson and Ferrell started Policeabuse.com to provide a safe place for citizens to report complaints. Over 25 years, the website has processed more than 20,000 complaints for citizens free of charge. Through the website Ferrell and Jackson have pioneered hundreds of investigations resulting in prosecutions of police officers, policy changes, and settlements for indigent victims. Today their work stands alone as the only national hidden camera testing of police complaint intake procedures and racial profiling ever done. Their work is a 600 video YouTube archive of investigations on behalf of police misconduct victims. Many police agencies have made policy changes as a direct result of Jackson's hidden camera investigations. Jackson and Ferrell's videotapes and training materials have been utilized to educate both officers and citizens alike.

In 1994, as a political statement, Jackson changed his name to Diop Kamau (Quiet Soldier) to acknowledge his daughter's birth. 24 years later Jackson returned to his birth name Don Jackson, as a tribute to his father Woodrow Jackson, the best cop he had ever known.

Personal life
He is married to the actress Tyra Ferrell. He was born in Los Angeles, California. He has 2 daughters.

References

External links
policeabuse.com: official website of the Police Complaint Center
"Expert Witness Report" companion website

American civil rights activists
Living people
People from Hawthorne, California
Activists from California
1958 births
California Lutheran University alumni